Massachusetts House of Representatives' 4th Middlesex district in the United States is one of 160 legislative districts included in the lower house of the Massachusetts General Court. It covers parts of Middlesex County and Worcester County. Democrat Danielle Gregoire of Marlborough has represented the district since 2013. Candidates running for this district seat in 2020 include Jeanne Cahill and Syed Hashmi.

Towns represented
The district includes the following localities:
 part of Marlborough
 part of Northborough
 part of Westborough

The current district geographic boundary overlaps with those of the Massachusetts Senate's Middlesex and Worcester district and 1st Worcester district.

Former locales
The district previously covered:
 Malden, circa 1872 
 Somerville, circa 1872

Representatives
 Phineas Sprague, circa 1858 
 John Q. A. Griffin, circa 1859 
 Moses Davis Church, circa 1888 
 Isaac S. Pear, circa 1888 
 John C Brimblecom, circa 1920 
 Bernard Earley, circa 1920 
 Abbott B. Rice, circa 1920 
 Christian Archibald Herter, Jr., circa 1951 
 George E. Rawson, circa 1951 
 John Joseph Toomey, circa 1975 
 Saundra Graham, 1977-1979
 Joseph M. Navin, 1979-1984
 Robert A. Durand, 1984-1991
 Daniel J. Valianti, 1991-1997
 Stephen P. LeDuc, 1997-2008
 Danielle W. Gregoire, 2009-2011
 Steven Levy, 2011-2013
 Danielle W. Gregoire, 2013-current

See also
 List of Massachusetts House of Representatives elections
 Other Middlesex County districts of the Massachusetts House of Representatives: 1st, 2nd, 3rd, 5th, 6th, 7th, 8th, 9th, 10th, 11th, 12th, 13th, 14th, 15th, 16th, 17th, 18th, 19th, 20th, 21st, 22nd, 23rd, 24th, 25th, 26th, 27th, 28th, 29th, 30th, 31st, 32nd, 33rd, 34th, 35th, 36th, 37th
 List of Massachusetts General Courts
 List of former districts of the Massachusetts House of Representatives

Images
Portraits of legislators

References

External links
 Ballotpedia
  (State House district information based on U.S. Census Bureau's American Community Survey).

House
Government of Middlesex County, Massachusetts
Government in Worcester County, Massachusetts